"Lyin' Eyes" is a song written by Don Henley and Glenn Frey and recorded in 1975 by the American rock band Eagles, with Frey singing lead vocals. It was the second single from their album One of These Nights, reaching No. 2 on the Billboard Hot 100 chart and No. 8 on the Billboard Country chart. It remained their only top 40 country hit until "How Long" in 2007–2008.

The Eagles received a Grammy Award for Best Pop Vocal Performance by a Duo, Group or Chorus for "Lyin' Eyes", and were nominated for Record of the Year.

Background and writing
The title and idea for the song came when Glenn Frey and Don Henley were in their favorite Los Angeles restaurant/bar Dan Tana's which was frequented by many beautiful women, and they started talking about beautiful women who were cheating on their husbands. They saw a beautiful young woman with a fat and much older wealthy man, and Frey said: "She can't even hide those lyin' eyes." According to Henley, Frey was the main writer of the song, although he had some input with the verses and the music.  The song was written when Frey and Henley were sharing a house in Trousdale, Beverly Hills.  Frey said of the writing of the song: "...the story had always been there. I don’t want to say it wrote itself, but once we started working on it, there were no sticking points. Lyrics just kept coming out, and that’s not always the way songs get written." During the Eagles 2013 concert tour, Frey stated it was written in just two evenings.

"Lyin' Eyes" is the only song on the One of These Nights album that Frey sang solo lead on (he shared lead vocals with Henley on "After the Thrill Is Gone"). The song was released as the second single from One of These Nights, and reached No. 2 on the Billboard Hot 100 chart, behind “Island Girl” by Elton John. "Lyin' Eyes" also crossed over to the Country chart where it reached No. 8, their first on that chart and a feat few rock bands could have achieved at that time.

The single version of the song was shortened considerably from the album version, removing the entire second verse, the second chorus and four lines in the middle of the third verse.

Reception
Billboard described the song as "a country flavored story of a girl who drives across town daily to meet someone a bit more suited to her than the one she lives with," and praised the instrumentals and harmony vocals.  Cash Box said that "the instrumentation is lightly acoustic, with a sobbing pedal steel lacing together the plaintive lead vocal and chorus" and mentioned "the Eagles' uncanny talent for fitting hit-making riffs together." Billboard and Rolling Stone both ranked "Lyin' Eyes" as the Eagles' seventh-greatest song.

Covers
Among the many covers of "Lyin' Eyes" are Lynn Anderson's 1976 recording and Kenny Rankin's 1980 version on his After The Roses album. Diamond Rio also covered the song on the 1993 compilation Common Thread: The Songs of the Eagles.

Personnel 
 Glenn Frey – lead vocals, acoustic guitar
 Don Felder – acoustic guitar
 Bernie Leadon – lead guitar, mandolin, backing vocals
 Randy Meisner – bass, backing vocals
 Don Henley – drums, percussion, harmony and backing vocals

Additional musician
 Jim Ed Norman – acoustic piano

Charts

Certifications

References

1975 singles
1993 singles
Eagles (band) songs
Diamond Rio songs
Rock ballads
Pop ballads
Songs about infidelity
Songs written by Don Henley
Songs written by Glenn Frey
Asylum Records singles
Song recordings produced by Bill Szymczyk
1975 songs